Ivan Farron (born 17 November 1971, Basel) is a Swiss French speaking  writer from Vaud.

Biography 
Born in Tavannes, Ivan Farron is a graduate of the business school of Lausanne. He then attended the evening gymnasium to enter the Faculty of Arts of the University of Lausanne. After obtaining his bachelor's degree, he worked as an assistant to the chair of French literature at the University of Zurich, where he obtained a doctorate.

He was revealed by his first narration crowned by the Prix Dentan in 1996, Un après-midi avec Wackernagel, in which a young man awaits with anguish a childhood friend who has just spent six months in a psychiatric asylum and wonders about the changes that have taken place during this long absence.

Ivan Farron is a member of the  association.

Publications 
1995: Un après-midi avec Wackernagel, Prix Dentan 1996
2004: Pierre Michon. La grâce par les œuvres, Éditions Zoé, 
2005: Panégyrique de Bertram Rothe, in "La collection de Bertram Rothe", Lausanne, art&fiction, 
2006: Les déménagements inopportuns, Éditions Zoé, Prix Fénéon 2006 
2010: Allégories, in "Mode de vie", art&fiction, 
2011: L'appétit limousin. Quelques réflexions sur Les Onze de Pierre Michon,

Sources 
 Anne-Lise Delacrétaz, Daniel Maggetti, Écrivaines et écrivains d'aujourd'hui, 2002, p. 281-282
 Roger Francillon, Histoire de la littérature de Suisse romande, vol. 4, p. 441
 Hebdo n° 4, 2001
 Jean Kaempfer, Le Temps, 2006/02/04

External links 
 Ivan Farron on the site of the Bibliothèque cantonale et uniersitaire of the Cantonal and University Library of Lausanne
 Jean-Michel Olivier - Feuilleton littéraire 
 Pierre Michon sur remue.net
 A D S - Autorinnen und Autoren der Schweiz - Autrices et Auteurs de Suisse - Autrici ed Autori della Svizzera

21st-century Swiss writers
Prix Fénéon winners
University of Lausanne alumni
University of Zurich alumni
1971 births
Writers from Basel-Stadt
Living people